Bruce Turner Marshall (July 23, 1962 – October 15, 2016) was an American ice hockey coach who was – at his death – the head coach at Franklin Pierce University. He was previously the head coach of the Connecticut Huskies ice hockey team. Marshall took over for Ben Kirtland prior to the start of the 1988–1989 season. In his 24 years as the coach since then, he has transitioned them to Division I status. Just ten years later, in 1998–1999, the Huskies began Division I play. In their first year at the highest level, Connecticut went 20–10–4. The next year was successful as well, for a new program, with a 19–16–1 record overall. However, that success was short lived, as Marshall and the Huskies have finished with a losing record every year since, consistently rating near the very bottom of the RPI ratings. Marshall's 2010–11 season was his best in recent history, however, when he did manage to reach the 2011 AHA semifinals in Rochester.

On January 7, 2013, Marshall resigned as head coach for health reasons. He had been on a medical leave of absence since November 6, 2012. Assistant coach David Berard was named head coach for the remainder of the 2012–13 season. Following a nationwide search, Mike Cavanaugh was named as Marshall's replacement after serving 18 years as an assistant at Boston College  He died on October 15, 2016 at the age of 54.

Head coaching record

† Marshall stepped down on November 6 2012

References

External links
 Official biography, Franklin Pierce Ravens

Ice hockey coaches from Massachusetts
American ice hockey coaches
UConn Huskies men's ice hockey coaches
People from West Boylston, Massachusetts
1962 births
UConn Huskies men's ice hockey players
2016 deaths
Sportspeople from Worcester County, Massachusetts